The Tenpō famine (天保の飢饉, Tenpō no kikin), also known as the Great Tenpō famine (天保の大飢饉, Tenpō no daikikin) was a famine that affected Japan during the Edo period. Considered to have lasted from 1833 to 1837, it was named after the Tenpō era (1830–1844), during the reign of Emperor Ninkō. The ruling shōgun during the famine was Tokugawa Ienari.

The famine was most severe in northern Honshū and was caused by flooding and cold weather.

The famine was one of a series of calamities that shook the faith of the people in the ruling bakufu. During the same period as the famine, there were also the Kōgo Fires of Edo (1834) and a 7.6 magnitude earthquake in the Sanriku region (1835). In the last year of the famine, Ōshio Heihachirō led a revolt in Osaka against corrupt officials, who refused to help feed the impoverished residents of the city. Another revolt sprung up in Chōshū Domain. Also in 1837, the American merchant vessel Morrison appeared off the coast of Shikoku and was driven away by coastal artillery. Those incidents made the Tokugawa bakufu look weak and powerless, and they exposed the corruption of the officials who profited while the commoners suffered.

See also
1837 tsunami
List of famines
Kan'ei Great Famine

References

Famines in Japan
Natural disasters in Japan
1833 in Japan
1834 in Japan
1835 in Japan
1836 in Japan
1837 in Japan
19th-century famines
1833 disasters in Japan 
1830s disasters in Japan